Kartika Vedhayanto Putra (born 25 January 2002) is an Indonesian professional footballer who plays as a right-back for Liga 1 club PSIS Semarang.

Club career

PSIS Semarang
He was signed for PSIS Semarang to play in Liga 1 in the 2021 season. Vedhayanto made his professional debut on 15 October 2021 in a match against Persik Kediri at the Manahan Stadium, Surakarta.

Career statistics

Club

Honours

International
Indonesia U-16
 AFF U-16 Youth Championship: 2018

References

External links
 Kartika Vedhayanto at Soccerway

2002 births
Living people
Indonesian footballers
Liga 1 (Indonesia) players
PSIS Semarang players
Association football defenders
Indonesia youth international footballers
People from Semarang
Sportspeople from Central Java